Bolivia traditionally has maintained normal diplomatic relations with all hemispheric states except Chile. Foreign relations are handled by the Ministry of Foreign Affairs, headed by the Chancellor of Bolivia, Rogelio Mayta.

Overview
Relations with Chile, strained since Bolivia's defeat in the War of the Pacific (1879–83) and its loss of the coastal province of Atacama, were severed from 1962 to 1975 in a dispute over the use of the waters of the Lauca River. Relations were resumed in 1975 but broken again in 1978 over the inability of the two countries to reach an agreement that solved the Atacama border dispute, which might have granted Bolivia a sovereign access to the sea. In the 1960s, relations with Cuba were broken by the Bolivian dictatorship following Castro's rise to power but resumed under the Paz Estenssoro Administration in 1985, which came to power through democratic elections.

Bolivia pursues a foreign policy with a heavy economic component. Bolivia has become more active in the Organization of American States (OAS), the Rio Group, and in MERCOSUR, with which it signed an association agreement in 1996. Bolivia promotes its policies on sustainable development and the empowerment of indigenous people.

Bolivia is a member of the United Nations and some of its specialized agencies and related programs; OAS; Andean Community; INTELSAT; Non-Aligned Movement; International Parliamentary Union; Latin American Integration Association ALADI; World Trade Organization; Rio Treaty; Rio Group; and Uruguay, Paraguay, Bolivia (URUPABOL, restarted in 1993). As an outgrowth of the 1994 Summit of the Americas, Bolivia hosted a hemispheric summit conference on sustainable development in December 1996. A First Ladies' hemispheric summit was also hosted by Bolivia that same month.

Bolivia is also a member of the International Criminal Court with a Bilateral Immunity Agreement of protection for the United States-military (as covered under Article 98).

The GeGaLo Index of gains and losses after energy transition ranks Bolivia 128th out of 156 countries. It is thus among the countries that will lose strength on the international stage if a global transition to renewable energy is carried out and there is no longer demand for Bolivian oil and gas. It is estimated to experience the third largest loss of all Latin American countries (after Colombia and Venezuela).

United Nations involvement

Bolivia, being one of the founding members of the United Nations, has frequently been involved with the Intergovernmental Organisation . In November 2008, the Bolivian contingent of UN peacekeeping troops with the United Nations Organization Stabilization Mission in the Democratic Republic of the Congo was relocated to safety, as at least one other regional state was also reviewing its own mission's security. The country had a detachment of 130 soldiers that was working in Bukavu, but was moved to a location near Goma. Bolivia currently serves as a non-permanent member of the United Nations Security Council, with a two-year term ending in 2018. While a member of the Security Council, Bolivia strongly criticized United States President Donald Trump's decision to move the United States' Embassy in Israel from Tel Aviv to Jerusalem, and called for a public meeting of the Security Council to respond to the decision. The Bolivian delegation also joined Russia in casting a negative vote for the renewal of the OPCW-UN Joint Investigative Mechanism in Syria, citing technical concerns about the Mechanism.

During the United Nations General Assembly Resolution ES-11/1, on March 2, 2022, Bolivia voted to abstain, along with 34 other nations.

International disputes
Bolivia has wanted a sovereign corridor to the South Pacific Ocean since the Atacama area was lost to Chile in 1884; dispute with Chile over Rio Lauca water rights.

Since the accession of Carlos Mesa to the Presidency, Bolivia has pressed its demands for a corridor to the Pacific. In March 2004, Mesa announced that the government would stage a series of public rallies across the country and in Bolivian embassies abroad in remembrance of those who died in the War of the Pacific, and to call for Chile to grant Bolivia a seacoast. Mesa made this demand a cornerstone of his administration's policy.

The incumbent president seeking reelection for a fourth term, maintains a hard position on this issue of which the symbolic importance is underlined by the fact that Bolivia also still has a navy, despite it not currently having access to the sea. In October 2018, the ICJ (International Court of Justice), ruled against Bolivia in a case that would determine whether or not Bolivia could force Chile to negotiate access to the sea. However, the ICJ did state that cooperation was desirable if workable solutions are to be found.

Illicit drugs
Bolivia is the world's third-largest cultivator of coca (after Peru and Colombia) with an estimated  under cultivation in 1999, a 45% decrease in overall cultivation of coca from 1998 levels; intermediate coca products and cocaine exported to or through Colombia, Brazil, Argentina, and Chile to the United States and other international drug markets; alternative crop program aims to reduce illicit coca cultivation.

Bilateral relations

Africa

Americas

Asia

Europe

Oceania

See also
Bolivia and the International Monetary Fund
Foreign policy of Evo Morales
List of diplomatic missions in Bolivia
List of diplomatic missions of Bolivia
Foreign aid to Bolivia

References